Apallates is a genus of fly in the family Chloropidae.

Species
A. convexus (Loew, 1866)
A. coxendix (Fitch, 1856)
A. dissidens (Tucker, 1908)
A. hermsi (Sabrosky, 1941)
A. microcentrus (Coquillett, 1904)
A. montanus (Sabrosky, 1941)
A. neocoxendix (Sabrosky, 1040)
A. ochripes (Sabrosky, 1940)
A. particeps (Becker, 1912)
A. tener (Coquillett, 1990)

References

Nearctic

Oscinellinae
Chloropidae genera
Taxa named by Curtis Williams Sabrosky